Ngatikese, or Sapwuahfik, is a Micronesian language originating on Sapwuahfik atoll, Federated States of Micronesia. Of the 700 Ngatikese speakers, only about 450 live on Sapwuahfik. It was previously considered a distinct dialect of Pohnpeian, but was later reclassified as the two proved to be only partially mutually intelligible. It is currently considered vulnerable, as many of its speakers have gradually shifted to Pohnpeian.

Ngatikese has a men's register.

References

External links 
 Kaipuleohone houses the Rentz collection, which includes recordings of Ngatikese

Endangered Austronesian languages
Pohnpeic languages
Pohnpei
Languages of the Federated States of Micronesia